The 2006 Havant Borough Council election took place on 4 May 2006 to elect members of Havant Borough Council in Hampshire, England. One third of the council was up for election and the Conservative Party stayed in overall control of the council.

After the election, the composition of the council was:
Conservative 30
Labour 4
Liberal Democrats 4

Background
After the last election in 2004 the Conservatives had 27 seats, compared to 6 for Labour and 5 for the Liberal Democrats. However, in 2005 a Liberal Democrat councillor for Hart Plain, Ron Purkis, defected to the Conservatives.

Election result
The Conservatives increased their majority on the council to hold 30 of the 38 seats on the council after getting a swing in their favour. Labour lost 2 seats in Leigh Park, with sitting councillors Ralph Cousins and Barry Gardner losing to the Conservatives and Liberal Democrats respectively. Overall turnout at the election was 33.5%.

Following the election Conservative David Gillett remained as leader of the council after surviving a leadership challenge within the Conservative group from David Guest by 4 votes.

Ward results

Barncroft

Battins

Bedhampton

Bondfields

Cowplain

Emsworth

Hart Plain

Hayling East

Hayling West

Purbrook

St Faiths

Stakes

Warren Park

Waterloo

By-elections between 2006 and 2007

Battins
A by-election was held in Battins ward on 2 November 2006 after the death of Conservative councillor Jane Rayner. The seat was gained for the Liberal Democrats by Faith Ponsonby with a majority of 137 votes.

Hart Plain
A by-election was held in Hart Plain ward on 30 November 2006 after Liberal Democrat councillor Tricia Pearce resigned from the council. Conservative Elaine Shimbart gained the seat from the Liberal Democrats by a majority of 246 votes.

References

2006 English local elections
Havant Borough Council elections
2000s in Hampshire